The National Administrative Council (NAC) was the executive council of the Independent Labour Party (ILP), a British socialist party which was active from 1893 until 1975.

Creation
The Independent Labour Party (ILP) was founded at a conference in Bradford in 1893 by a large number of localised organisations.  Delegates wished there to be a body which would implement policy between conferences, and also raise funds, and select candidates for Parliamentary elections.  However, the local organisations did not wish the new body to have too much power, requiring it not to initiate any policy which had not been approved by a conference, and to emphasise this subordinate nature, it was decided to name it the "National Administrative Council", rather than "Executive Committee".

The first NAC was elected on a regional basis, with five seats for the Northern Counties, four for London, three for Scotland, and three for the Midland Counties.  The membership was:

There were many candidates from the North and Scotland to choose from, but the London candidates were better known for their national activity than their local work, and there was a lack of suitable candidate from the Midlands.  It was decided that there would be no chair, and the NAC would meet at locations around the country.  However, a lack of funds led to it meeting only twice: in Manchester in March, and Halifax in November.  However, it succeeded in agreeing to distance the organisation from Henry Hyde Champion, and it selected seven candidates for the next UK general election.

1894 to 1906
The second conference of the ILP, held in Manchester in 1894, started with the reading of the minutes of the NAC meetings.  The organisation decided to only permit ILP branches to send delegates, and this less individualised membership agreed to reduce the NAC to nine members.  Three would be elected as president, treasurer and general secretary, while the other six would be elected by all delegates, using plurality-at-large voting.  Only three members retained their seats, and Keir Hardie was elected, establishing his dominance within the party.  The NAC now met more frequently, and had a greater role in determining policy.

The title of president was changed to chairman in 1896, and by 1898, the membership of the NAC had begun to settle down, with Hardie joined by Ramsay Macdonald, Bruce Glasier and Philip Snowden, and the "Big Four" held the leading roles in the party for many years.

1906 to 1909
By 1906, there was a feeling that there was too little change in the membership of the NAC, and activists highly popular in one region but little known in others were unable to win places on it.  As a result, seven regional divisions were created, each holding conferences to elect one NAC member, joined by the chair, treasurer and secretary and four national members, who continued to be elected by delegates at conference.

1909 to 1970
In 1909, the divisions were reorganised, and four more created, and further adjustments were made over the next three years, including in 1912 the formation of a single division for the whole of Wales.  This endured for many decades.

From 1935, the ILP's conferences were based around a policy statement from the NAC.  The NAC began electing a smaller executive committee from its ranks, and with the executive committee taking on more powers, the NAC met less frequently.

1970 onwards
Faced with a continuing decline in membership, in 1970 the NAC was restructured, with twelve members serving alongside the chair, treasurer and general secretary.

References

 Annual Reports of the National Administrative Committee (1893–1970)

Independent Labour Party